Tiana Davison (born 26 October 2000) is a New Zealand professional rugby league footballer who currently plays for the Newcastle Knights in the NRL Women's Premiership.

Background
Born in New Plymouth, Taranaki, New Zealand, Davison played rugby union for the Clifton Rugby Club growing up.

Playing career

Early years
In 2017, Davison was selected in the New Zealand under-17 and under-18 girl's rugby sevens wider training group, to prepare for a development camp in Auckland. By 2018, she was playing for the senior Clifton Rugby Club women's team and was a part of the winning New Zealand side at the Oceania under-18s Sevens Championship. In 2019, she played for the Manawatu Rugby Union club in the Farah Palmer Cup, before joining the Taranaki Whio in 2020. In November 2020, she was selected in the Red Bull Ignite7 sevens squad.

2022
In 2022, Davison returned to the Clifton Rugby Club side in the Taranaki women's competition. In June, she signed with the Newcastle Knights in the NRL Women's Premiership for the 2022 season, making the switch to rugby league, despite never having played a game in the sport before. In round 3 of the 2022 NRLW season, she made her NRLW debut for the Knights against the Parramatta Eels.

References

External links
Newcastle Knights profile

2000 births
Australian rugby league players
Newcastle Knights (NRLW) players
Rugby league second-rows
Rugby league players from New Plymouth
Living people